John Wainwright may refer to: 
John Wainwright (author) (1921–1995), British crime novelist and author
John L. Wainwright, Hampshire-born writer and historian
John Wainwright (composer) (1723–1768), English composer
John Wainwright (computer scientist)
John Wainwright (soldier) (1839–1915), American Civil War soldier who received the Medal of Honor 
John Wainwright (Royal Navy officer)

See also
Jonathan Wainwright (disambiguation)